Alaap (lit. Prelude) is a 1977 Indian musical drama film produced by Hrishikesh Mukerjee and N.C Sippy and directed by Hrishikesh Mukherjee. The film stars Amitabh Bachchan, Rekha, Asrani, Farida Jalal, Om Prakash and Manmohan. The music is by Jaidev.

Plot
Widowed Advocate Triloki Prasad (Om Prakash) lives a wealthy lifestyle in a small town in India with two sons, Advocate Ashok (Vijay Sharma) married to Geeta (Lily Chakravarty) and Alok (Amitabh Bachchan) who has yet to settle down in their law firm. Alok is fond of music and enrolls in classes run by Pandit Jamuna Prasad (A. K. Hangal). On his return, his father asks him to accompany Ashok to their law firm and start learning to practice, which he agrees to do. One day, Triloki finds out that Alok has not been going the firm but is instead spending time in the local slums with a former courtesan named Sarju Bai Banaraswali (Chhaya Devi). He cautions Alok about this, but Alok continues to visit Sarju Bai. When Mr. Gupta (Yunus Parvez) approaches Triloki about taking possession and demolishing the slum area, Triloki readily agrees and with his expertise manages to sway the Court's decision in Gupta's favor. As a result, Sarju Bai and others are rendered homeless. With the fee he receives from Gupta, he asks Alok to purchase a used car for himself. But Alok purchases a horse-carriage and decides to drive it himself to make a living. His enraged father asks him to leave the house. When Triloki finds out that Alok is doing well in his work, he decides to hire motor coaches to transport people at a much cheaper price, thus cutting off Alok's earnings and perhaps forcing him to reconsider his decision, apologize, and return home to his father. The remainder of the film deals with Alok battling all contradiction, and if the father-son duo continue to harbour their differences.

Cast
Amitabh Bachchan as Alok Prasad
Rekha as Radhakumari (Radhiya)
Om Prakash as Advocate Triloki Prasad
Vijay Sharma as Ashok Prasad
Lily Chakraborty as Geeta A. Prasad
Master Ravi as Alok & Radha's son
Chhaya Devi as Sarju Bai Banaraswali
Asrani as Ganesh (Ganeshi)
Manmohan Krishna as Maharaj Dinanath
Farida Jalal as Sulakshana Gupta
Yunus Parvez as Mr. Gupta
Lalita Kumari as Mrs. Gupta
Benjamin Gilani as Kishan
A. K. Hangal as Pandit Jamuna Prasad (Guest Appearance)
Sanjeev Kumar as Raja Bahadur (Guest Appearance)
Jhumur - Guest Appearance

Crew
Director - Hrishikesh Mukherjee
Story - Hrishikesh Mukherjee
Screenplay - Bimal Dutta
Dialogue - Rahi Masoom Raza, Biren Tripathy, Jehan Nayyar
Editor - Khan Zaman Khan
Producer - Hrishikesh Mukherjee, N.C. Sippy, Romu N. Sippy
Production Company - Rupam Chitra
Cinematographer - Jaywant Pathare
Art Director - Ajit Banerjee
Costume Designer - Bhanu Athaiya, Shalini Shah
Costume and Wardrobe - Babu Ghanekar

Soundtrack

All songs were written by Rahi Masoom Raza except for 'Koi Gata Main So Jata' which was a work done by Harivansh Rai Bachchan and 'Mata Saraswati Sharda' which is a traditional Saraswati Vandana.

External links

1977 films
1970s Hindi-language films
Films scored by Jaidev
Films directed by Hrishikesh Mukherjee
Indian drama films
1977 drama films
Hindi-language drama films